The 2022 Formula 4 United States Championship season was the seventh season of the Formula 4 United States Championship, a motor racing series regulated according to FIA Formula 4 regulations and sanctioned by SCCA Pro Racing, the professional racing division of the Sports Car Club of America.

Teams and drivers

Race calendar 

The 2022 calendar was announced on 23 September 2021. The series planned to hold a pre-season test at Road Atlanta in March but it was moved to NOLA Motorsports Park. Each round featured three races.

Championship standings
Points were awarded as follows:

Drivers' standings

Teams' standings
Each team acquired the points earned by their two best drivers in each race.

Notes

References

External links 

 

United States F4 Championship seasons
United States F4
Formula 4 United States Championship
United States F4